Lake Margaret is a concrete-faced gravity dam with an uncontrolled spillway across the Yolande River, located on the north side of Mount Sedgwick, in the West Coast Range, West Coast of Tasmania, Australia.

The impounded reservoir is also called Lake Margaret.

The dam was constructed in 1918 by the Mount Lyell Mining and Railway Company for the purpose of generating hydro-electric power via the Lake Margaret Power Station, which is located below the dam wall. Following the closure of the Mount Lyell Mining and Railway Company, in 1985 the control of the dam, lake, and power station was transferred to Hydro Tasmania.

Features and location
The dam, called Lake Margaret, was completed in 1918 and it was the first gravity dam constructed in Tasmania. It was built of concrete with conglomerate "plums". In 1974 the dam wall was strengthened by the use of prestressed anchors and grouting of open joints.

The Lake Margaret dam impounds the Yolande River, which also is the outflow from the dam. Further west the Yolande joins with the Langdon River, another West Coast Range west flowing river, to join with the Henty River west of the Zeehan Highway.

Reservoir
Mount Sedgwick is to the south.

Numerous smaller lakes – some named and some not – lie above the location of the Lake Margaret. The vesting of the catchment with the current operator of the hydro electric power station, makes the two feeder parts of the catchment specific Hydro land in contrast to the surrounding landscape which is either in the Tyndall Regional Reserve or the Lake Beatrice Conservation Area.

The eastern feeder starts at an unnamed lake to Lake Polycarp, Lake Peter, Lake Paul, Lake Apollos, and then to Lake Phillip.

The larger lower altitude natural lake of the area lies to the south east side of Mount Sedgwick and is known as Lake Beatrice.

Power scheme
The initial purpose of Lake Margaret when it was constructed by the Mount Lyell Mining and Railway Company was to generate hydroelectric power for the -based Mount Lyell mine, railway, and surrounding community. While the mine has since closed, the purpose of Lake Margaret to generate power remains unchanged. Hydro Tasmania took ownership of the power station in 1985. Water travels from Lake Margaret through a woodstave  pipeline to the power station.

In 1931 a minihydro plant was constructed to provide additional power. The single Turgo turbine generates . Hydro Tasmania took ownership of the power station in 1985 and decommissioned the plant in 1994. The station was reopened in 2010 following refurbishment that included a new penstock, turbine and woodstave pipeline.

See also

List of reservoirs and dams in Tasmania
List of lakes in Tasmania
List of power stations in Tasmania

References

Further reading
 
 
 

Margaret
Mount Lyell Mining and Railway Company
West Coast Range
Margaret